The Finnish Masters was a golf tournament on the Challenge Tour between 1998 and 2000. It was played annually at Master Golf Club in Espoo, Finland.

Winners

References

External links
Coverage on the Challenge Tour's official site

Former Challenge Tour events
Golf tournaments in Finland